This is a list of countries by zinc production in 2019 based on United States Geological Survey numbers.

References
	

Zinc
Production